Never Dead may refer to:

NeverDead, a 2012 video game.
Never Dead, the working title of the 1979 film Phantasm.
 "Never Dead", a song by Megadeth form Th1rt3en